Annone Veneto is a town in the Metropolitan City of Venice, Veneto, northern Italy, located near the Livenza river.  The SP61 provincial road passes through  the town.

References

Cities and towns in Veneto